The 15th Asian Junior Table Tennis Championships 2009 were held in Jaipur, India, from  22 to 26 July 2009. It was organised by the Table Tennis Federation of India under the authority of the Asian Table Tennis Union (ATTU).

Medal summary

Events

Medal table

See also

2009 World Junior Table Tennis Championships
Asian Table Tennis Championships
Asian Table Tennis Union

References

Asian Junior and Cadet Table Tennis Championships
Asian Junior and Cadet Table Tennis Championships
Asian Junior and Cadet Table Tennis Championships
Asian Junior and Cadet Table Tennis Championships
Table tennis competitions in India
International sports competitions hosted by India
Asian Junior and Cadet Table Tennis Championships